Mycobacterium virus L5 is a bacteriophage known to infect bacterial species of the genus Mycobacterium.

References

Siphoviridae
Mycobacteriophages